Women Living Under Muslim Laws (WLUML) is an international solidarity network established in 1984. It does academic and advocacy work in the fields of women's rights and secularism, focusing on the impact on women of laws inspired by Muslim religion or customs.

Origins
The trigger for the establishment of the network was independent events in various parts of the Muslim world, "in which women were deprived of so -called Islamic laws women of their human rights". Women from Algeria, Morocco, Sudan, Iran, Mauritius, Tanzania, Bangladesh and Pakistan founded an action committee in 1980 to support women's struggles for their rights on site. This resulted in the network with coordination offices in London, Dakar and Lahore between 1984 and 1986. It does not represent an ideology or uniform point of view.  

The network started out as a loose organization with no fixed membership, where individual and groups assumed responsibility for specific initiatives. It attracted women affected by Muslim laws, whether they are Muslims or not, bringing together religious believers, human rights advocates, secularists and atheists.
Until Marieme Helie Lucas retired as international coordinator in the late 1990s, it remained a fluid organization without clearly defined staff positions.

Research and current work
The network coordinates research exploring the mechanism by which laws affecting women borrow from cultural practices and colonial laws in addition to religious dogma, to eliminate progressive laws and restrict women's freedom. It also facilitates communication between women's groups across Africa and Asia, sharing success stories and helping to coordinate international actions. It conducted studies and advocated on issues such as forced marriage of girls and stoning. The group's research on the impact of Muslim family law led to the founding of the Musawah campaign in 2009.

Some governments look unfavorably upon the group's work. Collaboration with Women Living Under Muslim Laws was mentioned as a motive for the 2016 arrest of both Nazanin Zaghari-Ratcliffe and Homa Hoodfar by Iranian authorities.

See also 

 Women related laws in Pakistan
 Hermeneutics of feminism in Islam

References

Secularist organizations
Organisations based in London
Human rights organisations based in the United Kingdom